Bucorvus brailloni is an extinct ground hornbill. The only known fossil is of a femur dated to the Middle Miocene. It was found in Morocco, well north of the range of extant ground hornbill species.

References

Bucorvus
Miocene birds